Alex Mallari Jr. (born 19 February 1988) is a Canadian actor of Filipino ancestry.  He is known for his performances in the Syfy television series Dark Matter (2015–2017), Netflix feature film The Adam Project, and the Netflix series Ginny & Georgia (2021–present).

Life and career
Mallari was born on February 19, 1988, in the Philippines, but was raised in Scarborough, Ontario, Canada. Mallari was competitive at a national level in Taekwondo, for which he has a third-degree black belt. He was twice a Junior Canadian National Taekwondo champion. However, he gave that up when he was at the age of 13. He then took up basketball with the intention of turning professional but an injury prevented him from pursuing that profession.

While attending the University of Toronto, Mallari decided to pursue acting. His first notable acting role was as Four in the Syfy television series Dark Matter, based on the comic book series of the same name. He starred on the series from 2015 to 2017, for three seasons.

He has since starred in several films and televisions series, including the Netflix feature film The Adam Project, and the Netflix series Ginny & Georgia (2021–present).

Credits

Film

Television

Video games

References

External links
 

1988 births
Canadian male television actors
Living people
21st-century Canadian male actors
Filipino emigrants to Canada